Weltherrschaft is the first EP and sole release by the black metal band Mezzerschmitt. It was released in 2002 on Season of Mist productions. Weltherrschaft is a German word and translates to "World Domination".

Track listing

External links
Metal Archives

Mezzerschmitt albums
2002 EPs
Season of Mist EPs
Black metal EPs